Nāzi'āt (pluckers) and Nāshiṭāt (drawers) are two classes of death angels subordinate to Azra'il in Islam, responsible for taking the souls of the dead. While Nāzi'āt are commissioned to take the lives of unbelievers forcefully, the Nāshiṭāt take believers gently.

See also 

 Al-Nazi'at
 List of angels in theology

References

Classes of angels
Angels in Islam
Angels of death